is a railway station on the Kyudai Main Line in Yufu, Ōita, Japan, operated by Kyushu Railway Company (JR Kyushu).

Lines
Yufuin Station is served by the Kyudai Main Line.

Limited express services
 Yufuin-no-mori, Yufu (Hakata - Beppu)

Station layout
The station has a Midori no Madoguchi staffed ticket office.

History
The Daito Railway was nationalized on 1 December 1922, after which Japanese Government Railways (JGR) undertook phased westward expansion of the track which, at the time, it had designated as the Daito Line. By 1923, the track had reached  and then, on 29 July 1925, Yufuin (then known as Kita-Yufuin) was established as the new western terminus. On 15 November 1934, when the Daito Line had linked up with the Kyudai Main Line further west, JGR designated the station as part of the Kyudai Main Line. On 1 January 1950, the station was renamed Yufuin. With the privatization of Japanese National Railways (JNR), the successor of JGR, on 1 April 1987, the station came under the control of JR Kyushu.

Passenger statistics
In fiscal 2016, the station was used by an average of 1,167 passengers daily (boarding passengers only), and it ranked 144th among the busiest stations of JR Kyushu.

See also
List of railway stations in Japan

References

External links
Yufuin (JR Kyushu)

Railway stations in Ōita Prefecture
Stations of Kyushu Railway Company
Railway stations in Japan opened in 1925